A coupled human–environment system (known also as a coupled human and natural system, or CHANS) characterizes the dynamical two-way interactions between human systems (e.g., economic, social) and natural (e.g., hydrologic, atmospheric, biological, geological) systems. This coupling expresses the idea that the evolution of humans and environmental systems may no longer be treated as individual isolated systems. Some examples of coupled systems can be read here in the section "Socioeconomic Drivers":Environmental factor#Socioeconomic Drivers

As CHANS research is relatively new, it has not yet matured into a coherent field. Some research programs draw from, and build on, the perspectives developed in trans-disciplinary fields such as human ecology, ecological anthropology, environmental geography, economics, as well as others. In contrast, other research programs aim to develop a more quantitative theoretic framework focusing on the development of analytical and numerical models, by building on theoretical advances in complex adaptive systems, complexity economics, dynamical systems theory, and the earth sciences. To some extent, all CHANS programs recognize the need to move beyond traditional research methods developed in the social and natural sciences, as these are not sufficient to quantify the highly nonlinear dynamics often present in CHANS. Some research into CHANS emulates the more traditional research programs that tended to separate the social from the ecological sciences.

History
The phrase "coupled human–environment systems" appears in the earlier literature (dating back to 1999) noting that social and natural systems are inseparable. "In 2007 a formal standing program in Dynamics of Coupled Natural and Human Systems was created by the U.S. National Science Foundation." Research into CHANS is increasing in frequency in scientific literature concerning the sustainability and conservation of ecosystems and society.

Funding by the National Science Foundation to study "Dynamics of Coupled Natural and Human Systems" occurred from 2001-2005 as a part of a "special competition" within the "Biocomplexity in the environment" program, and in 2007 gained formal standing.

Bibliography
 W.C. Clark, B. L. Turner, R. W. Kates, J. Richards, J. T. Mathews, and W. Meyer, eds. The Earth as Transformed by Human Action.  (Cambridge, UK: Cambridge University Press, 1990).

 Eric Sheppard and Robert B. McMaster, eds. Scale and Geographic Inquiry: Nature, Society, and Method (see especially "Crossing the Divide: Linking Global and Local Scales in Human–Environment Systems" by William E. Easterling and Colin Polsky)  (Blackwell Publishing, January 1, 2004)

See also
Human ecology
Conservation medicine
Deep ecology

References

External links
CHANS-Net is an international network for researchers studying or people interested in the topic of Coupled Human and Natural Systems. The organization facilitates communication and collaboration.
Biocomplexity in the Environment, a 2006 priority area of the National Science Foundation.

Human geography
Human ecology
Environmental social science concepts